Time After Time is a novel by Allen Appel, first published in 1985 by Carroll & Graf. It launched the Alex Balfour series of time travel novels, which the author usually refers to as the "Pastmaster" series.

Characters and story
The story follows New School history professor Alex Balfour as he is tossed back and forth between present-day New York City and the Russian Revolution of 1917. Seeking an explanation for his unusual situation, Alex attempts to save Czar Nicholas and his family. In the course of the novel, he encounters Ivan Pavlov, Vladimir Lenin, Leon Trotsky and Grigory Rasputin.

Along with favorable reviews, the novel received recognition from the American Library Association as one of the Best Young Adult Novels of the Year . The novel gained more readers with a 1987 Dell Laurel Leaf edition displaying cover art by renowned illustrator Fred Marcellino, and it was reprinted again as a Dell mass-market paperback in 1990.

Other books in the series are Twice Upon a Time (1988), an American Library Association nominee in the Best Young Adult Novels of the Year category, and Till the End of Time (1990), another ALA nominee. In Time of War (2003) takes place during the American Civil War. Sea of Time, set aboard the Titanic, was written in 1987 but never published.

External links
Allen Appel's Time After Time
Review: The New York Times (January 26, 1986)

1985 American novels
Novels about time travel
1985 science fiction novels
American science fiction novels
Children's science fiction novels
Fiction set in 1917
Novels set in the Russian Revolution
1985 debut novels
Carroll & Graf books